Ten Years of Harmony is an official double album compilation album released by the Beach Boys in 1981, and spanning their entire Brother Records-era up to that point (1970–80), including some unreleased or rare material.  Although the song "Darlin'" had originally been recorded in 1967 while the group was signed to Capitol Records, the version on Ten Years of Harmony was recorded live in 1973 for the album The Beach Boys in Concert.

The Beach Boys had more or less splintered in 1981. Far from lucid, Brian Wilson would occasionally appear on stage, primarily as a replacement for brother Carl, who was embarking on a solo career. Dennis Wilson would show up to occasional concerts, but would usually be argumentative and disruptive. Mike Love, Al Jardine and Bruce Johnston were the only stable members of a band who now had a whole cast of supporting musicians when they performed live. However, the release of Ten Years of Harmony kept the pretense going and, unexpectedly, the M.I.U. Album cover of "Come Go with Me" became a US top-twenty hit when released as a single from this collection.

While taking tracks from 1970's Sunflower to 1980's Keepin' the Summer Alive, the compilers also included some oddities, rarities, and unreleased tracks. First, a handful of the songs, namely "Rock and Roll Music" and "California Saga: California" are presented in their original single mix. Moreover, Ten Years of Harmony includes a 1979 A-side "It's a Beautiful Day" (which failed to chart), a Dennis Wilson-written track called "San Miguel" (which was a Sunflower-era outtake from 1969), a cover of "Sea Cruise", which was a rejected track from the 15 Big Ones sessions, and a selection from Dennis' solo album, Pacific Ocean Blue, "River Song".

Only Beach Boys who were active throughout the whole decade (Al Jardine, Mike Love, Brian Wilson, Carl Wilson, and Dennis Wilson) appear on the gatefold cover on the original LP issue. 

Ten Years of Harmony, now out of print, sold enough in its release to reach number 156 in the US.

Track listing

Singles
 "Come Go with Me" (from M.I.U. Album) b/w "Don't Go near the Water" (from Surf's Up) (Brother/Caribou), November 2, 1981 US #18

Ten Years of Harmony (Brother/Caribou/CBS Z2X 37445) reached #156 in the US. during a chart stay of six weeks.

Personnel
The Beach Boys
 Brian Wilson – vocals, keyboards, Moog synthesizer, bass guitar, drums
 Mike Love – vocals
 Carl Wilson – vocals, lead guitar, rhythm guitar, keyboards, bass guitar, Moog bass, drums, percussion
 Al Jardine – vocals, rhythm guitar, bass guitar, banjo, lead guitar, Moog synthesizer
 Dennis Wilson – vocals, drums, keyboards
 Bruce Johnston – vocals, keyboards, mandolin
 Blondie Chaplin – vocals, lead guitar, bass guitar
 Ricky Fataar – vocals, drums
Additional musicians and production staff
 James William Guercio – bass guitar and co-producer of "Good Timin'"
 Jack Rieley – backing vocals
 Ed Carter – guitars, bass guitar
 Billy Hinsche – harmony and backing vocals, keyboards, rhythm guitar
 Mike Kowalski – percussion, drums
 Robert Kenyatta – congas
 Carlos Munoz – keyboards
 Marilyn Wilson, Diane Rovell – harmony and backing vocals
 Daryl Dragon – keyboards, vibraphone
 Stephen Desper – vocals, Moog synthesizer
 Sterling Smith – harpsichord
 Woody Thews – percussion

References

Sources
 "The Nearest Faraway Place: Brian Wilson, The Beach Boys and the Southern California Experience", Timothy White, c. 1994.
 "Wouldn't It Be Nice – My Own Story", Brian Wilson and Todd Gold, c. 1991.
 "Top Pop Singles 1955–2001", Joel Whitburn, c. 2002.
 "Top Pop Albums 1955–2001", Joel Whitburn, c. 2002.

1981 greatest hits albums
The Beach Boys compilation albums
Caribou Records compilation albums
Brother Records compilation albums